The Bram Stoker Award for Best Non-Fiction is an award presented by the Horror Writers Association (HWA) for "superior achievement" in horror writing for non-fiction.

Winners and nominees

See also 
 Bibliography of works on Dracula

References

External links
 Stoker Award on the HWA web page
 Graphical listing of all Bram Stoker award winners and nominees

Non-Fiction
Lists of books
American non-fiction literary awards
1987 establishments in the United States
Awards established in 1987
English-language literary awards